This is a list of Puerto Rican football clubs in North American competitions. Puerto Rican clubs have participated in competitive international football competitions since at least 2006 when the Puerto Rico Islands entered the 2006 CFU Club Championship.

Puerto Rican clubs are among the most successful Caribbean clubs. They have won two CFU Club Championships, and have reached the semifinals of the modern CONCACAF Champions League, the furthest of any Caribbean nation. The most successful team in international competition is the now-defunct Puerto Rico Islanders who have won the two CFU titles, and reached the Champions League semifinals.

Who qualifies for CONCACAF competitions 
Since 2018, the winner of the Liga Puerto Rico, the top tier of football on the island qualifies for the Caribbean Club Shield, a tertiary knockout tournament for developing Caribbean football nations. This competition is held in the spring. This also serves as a qualifying for the CONCACAF League, which played tha fall. The CONCACAF League is the secondary association football competition for club football in North America. Should a team finish in the top six standings of the CONCACAF League, they qualify for the CONCACAF Champions League, which is played the following winter.

In order for a Puerto Rican team to reach the Champions League, they would need to win the Caribbean Club Shield and then earn a top six finish in the CONCACAF League.

Results by competition

CONCACAF Champions League / Champions Cup

CONCACAF League

CFU Club Championship

CFU Club Shield

Appearances in CONCACAF competitions

References

External links 
 RSSSF International Club Results for North America
 Puerto Rico - List of Champions, RSSSF.com

 
North American football clubs in international competitions